Phyllis Weliver (born September 28, 1968) is an American academic specializing in Victorian literature and music history.

Career 
Weliver completed first degrees at Oberlin College, Oberlin Conservatory of Music, and the University of Cambridge, and her doctoral studies at the University of Sussex. She taught at Wilkes University, and is now Professor of English at Saint Louis University.

In 2011, Weliver became a lifetime Fellow of Gladstone's Library in Wales. She was a visiting scholar at St Catharine's College, Cambridge for the 2013–14 academic year.  She received a National Endowment for the Humanities Fellowship in 2015, and a National Endowment for the Humanities Summer Stipend in 2004.

Her publications focus on the nineteenth-century novel, Victorian poetry, and music in nineteenth-century Britain. In 2016, she began Sounding Tennyson , the first test case for adding sound to the International Image Interoperability Framework (IIIF). She has also contributed to BBC Two Television and to BBC Radio 3.

Selected publications 

 Mary Gladstone and the Victorian Salon: Music, Literature, Liberalism, Cambridge (2017)
 Words and Notes in the Long Nineteenth Century, with Katharine Ellis, Boydell & Brewer (2013)
 The Musical Crowd in English Fiction, 1840–1910: Class, Culture and Nation, Palgrave Macmillan (2006)
 The Figure of Music in Nineteenth-Century British Poetry. Ed. and intro. Phyllis Weliver. Ashgate (2005); Routledge (2016)
 Women Musicians in Victorian Fiction, 1860–1900: Representations of Music, Science and Gender in the Leisured Home, Ashgate (2000), Routledge (2016)
Sounding Tennyson

References 

1968 births
Living people
Saint Louis University faculty
Oberlin College alumni
Alumni of the University of Cambridge
Oberlin Conservatory of Music alumni
Alumni of the University of Sussex
American music historians
American women historians
20th-century American historians
21st-century American historians
21st-century American women writers
20th-century American women writers